Edwin Vargas Jr. (born January 4, 1949) is an American politician who has served in the Connecticut House of Representatives from the 6th district since 2013.  Before his election to the state house, Vargas made numerous runs for local office in Connecticut, stretching back to 1977, which mainly focused around the theme that Hispanic communities were not represented sufficiently in politics.

Vargas resigned from the Connecticut House of Representatives on January 3, 2023, to pursue an academic post at Central Connecticut State University.

References

1949 births
Living people
Hispanic and Latino American state legislators in Connecticut
Democratic Party members of the Connecticut House of Representatives
21st-century American politicians